The Battle of Ap Da Bien was a battle in the Vietnam War, which took place at dawn on 3 October 1973 when the 207th Regiment of the People's Army of Vietnam (PAVN) was raided by forces of the Army of the Republic of Vietnam while sheltering near the hamlet of Ap Da Bien in Thạnh Hóa District, Long An Province. The battle resulted in the death of over 200 soldiers of the PAVN 207th Regiment, of whom most were ex-students of the Hanoi University of Civil Engineering.

In 1991, a shrine called "Miếu Bắc Bỏ" (meaning "shrine of those who left the North") has been built by the locals of Ap Da Bien to honor the PAVN soldiers who were killed in this battle.

References 

Battles and operations of the Vietnam War
Battles and operations of the Vietnam War in 1973
October 1973 events in Asia
History of Long An Province